The 1958 BRSCC British Saloon Car Championship was the inaugural season of the championship. The series was open to four separate classes, up to 1200cc, 1201-1600cc, 1601-2700cc and 2701cc and above. Equal championship points were to be scored in each class, meaning any driver could win the championship without winning any races outright. The first ever round was actually held on 26 December 1957 at Brands Hatch. The final round of the year was held on 5 October back at Brands Hatch.

Jack Sears and Tommy Sopwith ended the final race on the same number of championship points. With this a possibility going into the final round it was initially suggested the champion would be decided by the toss of a coin. The idea was very unpopular with both drivers, and it was decided two identical looking Marcus Chambers-owned Riley One-Point-Five works rally cars would be brought along for a five lap shoot-out. To make the race fair, they raced five laps, switched cars, then raced five laps again with the driver who had the quickest combined time being crowned champion. In extremely wet conditions, the first head to head was won by Sopwith by 2.2 seconds. The second race was won by Sears by 3.8 seconds. This meant that Sears was crowned the first ever BSCC champion.

Calendar

Overall winners of multi-class races in bold.

1Classes combined.

Championship results

References

External links 
Official website of the British Touring Car Championship

British Touring Car Championship seasons
British Saloon Car Championship
Saloon Car Championship